Autograph is a 2010 Indian Bengali drama film by debutant director Srijit Mukherji. The movie is a tribute to Satyajit Ray's 1966 film Nayak and yesteryear Bengali actor Uttam Kumar, who portrayed the title role in the film. This was the First of the forthcoming  Long Collaboration between Srijit Mukherjee & Prosenjit Chatterjee. The movie is being remade in Malayalam.

Plot
The film starts with a proposal of remaking Satyajit Ray's famous Nayak by a debutant director and storywriter Shuvobrata (Indraneil Sengupta) to famous Bengali actor Arun Chatterjee (Prosenjit). Arun approves Shuvobrata's proposal and agrees to finance the project. Shuvobrata requests his live-in girlfriend Srinandita or Shrin (Nandana Sen) to act opposite Arun. In the meantime, Arun and Shrin become close friends and Arun tells her about various incident from his past in an emotionally triggered condition. The exchange is videotaped accidentally and Shuvobrata on discovering it leaks it to the press, without Srinandita's consent, as a publicity stunt for the film. Srinandita leaves Shuvobrata on learning of this indiscretion. Arun, furious about the leak, bars the film from being released. Arun later learns that Shrin had no role in the leak and apologizes to her. The movie ends with Shrin leaving a note and a phone number for Arun at a roadside dhaba where they had met earlier.

Cast
Prosenjit Chatterjee as Arun Chatterjee
Nandana Sen as Srinandita
Indraneil Sengupta as Shuvobrata Mitra
Rudraprasad Sengupta
Biswajit Chakraborty as Manoj Sarkar
Pijush Ganguly as Ashish Chakraborty
Dwijen Bandopadhyay as Parthapratim Nag
Sohini Paul as Ahona Dasgupta
 Dhruv Mookerji as Moloy Dasgupta
Dilip Roy as Tarun Mukherjee
Srijit Mukherji
 Sanghasri Sinha Mitra as Nandini
 Rii Sen as Rupali Gupto

Soundtrack
The music of the film is composed by Debojyoti Mishra and Anupam Roy. The lyrics have been penned by Anupam Roy, Srijato and Srijit Mukherji. The song Aamake Aamar Moto Thakte Dao turned out to be a popular amongst the Bengali audience. Chal Rastay, Uthche Jege Sokalgulo and Beche Thakar Gaan also received wide critical acclaim.

Trivia
The central character of the film is called Arun Chatterjee (Uttam Kumar’s real name). Srijit's touches make this film and the central story significantly different from Nayak. The film makes a few references to great filmmakers like Ingmar Bergman and films like Wild Strawberries. It alludes to the music of R.D. Burman, Red Sky at night by David Gilmour and The Godfather. There is also a sequence which uses the instrumental track "Yumeji's Theme" from Wong Kar Wai's film In the mood for love. There are pictures of Bengali film maestro Ritwik Ghatak and stills of Chhabi Biswas from his most memorable role in Jalshaghar on the wall of the studio featured in the film. Autograph is one of the highest grossing Tollywood film of 2010.

Recognition
The film premiered internationally at the Abu Dhabi Film Festival on 17 October 2010. 
The movie was showcased in New York City at the MIAAC (Mahindra Indo-American Arts Council) film festival, 2010 where it won a nomination for Prosenjit Chatterjee for the Best Actor award. It was also an official selection at the Glasgow International Film Festival and London Indian Film Festival in 2011. It was also showcased at the Kala Ghoda Film Festival in Mumbai in 2012 and the Darpan Film Festival in Singapore.

At the Kolkata box office it went on a record-breaking spree running successfully for 120 days, apart from runs in Delhi, Mumbai, Bangalore and Pune.

To date, Autograph has received a record 41 awards.

At the Big Bangla Movie Awards it won
 Best Film
 Best Director
 Best Actor (Prosenjit Chatterjee)
 Best Actor in a Negative Role (Indraneil Sengupta)
 Best Cinematography
 Best Editing
 Best Screenplay and Dialogues
 Best Music Director
 Best Lyricist (Anupam Roy for "Amake amar moto")
 Best Male Playback (Rupam Islam for "Beche thakar gaan") and 
 Best Female Playback (Shreya Ghoshal for "Chal rastay").
At the Zee TV Banglar Gourab Movie Awards, it won 
 Best Film, Best Director, 
 Best Debutante Director, 
 Best Actor (Prosenjit Chatterjee), 
 Best Screenplay and Dialogues, 
 Best Music Director, Best Lyricist (Anupam Roy for "Amake amar moto"), 
 Best Male Playback (Rupam Islam for "Beche thakar gaan") and 
 Best Female Playback (Shreya Ghoshal for "Chal rastay") awards. 
At the KKN-ABP Bangla Music awards, it won
 Best Album, Best Song ("Amake amar moto"), 
 Best Male Playback (Rupam Islam for "Beche thakar gaan") and 
 Best Lyricist (Anupam Roy for "Amake amar moto") awards. 
Anupam won the Best Song award for "Amake amar moto" at the Anandalok Awards.

At the Star Jalsha Entertainment Awards, it got 
 Best Director, Best Actor (Prosenjit Chatterjee), 
 Best Screenplay, 
 Best Cinematography, 
 Best Editing, 
 Best Female Playback (Shreya Ghoshal for "Chal rastay"), 
 Best Lyricist (Srijato for "Chal rastay") and 
 Best Upcoming Talent (Anupam Roy).
At the 11th Telecine Awards, it secured the awards for 
 Best Film, Best Director, 
 Best Actress (Nandana Sen), 
 Best Male Playback (Rupam Islam for "Beche thakar gaan") and 
 Best Lyricist (Anupam Roy for "Amake amar moto"). 
At the 2011 Big Bangla Rising Star Awards, it got awards for 
 Best Director, 
 Best Actress (Nandana Sen) and 
 Best Singer (Anupam Roy).

References

External links
 

2010 films
2010s Bengali-language films
Films scored by Anupam Roy
Films scored by Debojyoti Mishra
Bengali-language Indian films
Films set in Kolkata
Films directed by Srijit Mukherji